The Ansonia Cuban Giants, also known as the Ansonia Big Gorhams, were an all black team in the otherwise segregated Connecticut State League.

Players

Citations

Bibliography 

 
 
 
 

 
Defunct baseball teams in Connecticut
Baseball teams established in 1891
Baseball teams disestablished in 1891
Defunct Connecticut State League teams
Connecticut League teams
1891 establishments in Connecticut
1890s disestablishments in Connecticut